German submarine U-1199 was a Type VIIC U-boat built for Nazi Germany's Kriegsmarine for service during World War II.
She was laid down on 23 March 1943 by Schichau-Werke, Danzig as yard number 1569, launched on 12 October 1943 and commissioned on 23 December 1943 under Kapitänleutnant Rolf Nollmann.

Design
German Type VIIC submarines were preceded by the shorter Type VIIB submarines. U-1199 had a displacement of  when at the surface and  while submerged. She had two shafts and two  propellers.

U-1199 was fitted with five  torpedo tubes (four fitted at the bow and one at the stern), fourteen torpedoes or 26 TMA mines, one  SK C/35 naval gun, (220 rounds), one  Flak M42 and two twin  C/30 anti-aircraft guns. The boat had a complement of between 44 — 52 men.

Service history
The boat's service career began on 23 December 1943 with the 8th Training Flotilla, followed by active service with 1st Flotilla on 1 August 1944, followed by 11th Flotilla on 10 November 1944.

Wolfpacks
U-1199 took part in no wolfpacks

Fate
Obersteuermann Friedrich Claussen was the sole survivor, escaping via the conning tower as the submarine flooded.

Summary of raiding history

See also
 Battle of the Atlantic

References

Bibliography

External links

German Type VIIC submarines
U-boats commissioned in 1943
World War II submarines of Germany
1943 ships
World War II shipwrecks in the English Channel
Ships built in Danzig
U-boats sunk by British warships
U-boats sunk by depth charges
Maritime incidents in January 1945
Ships built by Schichau